Q80 may refer to:
 Q80 (New York City bus)
 Abasa, a surah of the Quran
 
 Kawai Q-80, a music sequencer